Ad Libitum Corporation is a 2020 Russian thriller film directed by Polina Oldenburg. It was theatrically released in Russia on January 21, 2020 by Capella Film.

Plot 
Ad Libitum Corporation is able to fulfill absolutely any desire. But, if a person has several desires, he will have to pay dearly for their embodiment.

Cast

References 

2021 films
2020s Russian-language films
2020s adventure thriller films
Russian adventure thriller films